Grodzisk  (Horodys’k) is a village in Siemiatycze County, Podlaskie Voivodeship, in north-eastern Poland. It is the seat of the gmina (administrative district) called Gmina Grodzisk.

The village has a population of 640.

References

Grodzisk
Belsky Uyezd (Grodno Governorate)
Białystok Voivodeship (1919–1939)
Belastok Region